Omosita discoidea is a species of sap-feeding beetle in the family Nitidulidae. It is found in Europe and Northern Asia (excluding China), North America, and Oceania.

References

Further reading

 

Nitidulidae
Articles created by Qbugbot
Beetles described in 1775
Taxa named by Johan Christian Fabricius